Edward Duckworth was a footballer. 

Edward Duckworth may also refer to:

Sir Edward Dyce Duckworth, 2nd Baronet (1875–1945), of the Duckworth baronets
Sir Edward Richard Dyce Duckworth, 4th Baronet (1943–2005), of the Duckworth baronets

See also
Duckworth (surname)